Novosphingobium rhizosphaerae  is a Gram-negative, non-spore-forming and rod-shaped bacterium from the genus Novosphingobium which has been isolated from the rhizosphere of the corn plant Zea mays in Tallassee, Alabama in the United States.

References

External links

Bacteria described in 2015
Sphingomonadales